Niwa is a Japanese surname. Notable people with the surname include:

Niwa clan, retainer clan of the Oda clan during the Sengoku period of Japan (1603 – 1868)
Niwa Nagaaki, Daimyō of Nihonmatsu, 1796 – 1813
Niwa Nagahide, Daimyō of Shirakawa
Niwa Nagahiro, Daimyō of Nihonmatsu, 1868 – 1871
Niwa Nagakuni, Daimyō of Nihonmatsu, 1858 – 1868
Niwa Nagashige, Daimyō of Shirakawa, 1628 – 1638
Niwa Nagatomi, Daimyō of Nihonmatsu, 1813 – 1858
, Japanese curler, 1998 Winter Olympics participant
Daiki Niwa (footballer), Japanese footballer
Hideki Niwa, Japanese politician
Koki Niwa, Japanese table tennis player
Mikiho Niwa, Japanese actress
, Japanese samurai and daimyō
Ryuhei Niwa, Japanese footballer
, Japanese footballer
Uichiro Niwa, Japanese diplomat and businessman
Yasujiro Niwa, Japanese scientist
Yuya Niwa, Japanese politician

Japanese-language surnames